Ash Sharqiyah South Governorate (English: Southeastern Governorate) is a governorate of Oman. It was created on 28 October 2011 when Ash Sharqiyah Region was split into Ash Sharqiyah North Governorate and Ash Sharqiyah South Governorate. The centre of the governorate is the Wilayat of Sur.

Provinces
Ash Sharqiyah South Governorate consists of five wilāyāt (provinces):
 Sur, population (2017): 121,088, (2020): 111,231
 Al-Kamil and Al-Wafi, population (2017): 33,341, (2020): 38,543
 Jalan Bani Bu Hassan, population (2017): 42,168, (2020): 44,593 
 Jalan Bani Bu Ali, population (2017): 100,506, (2020): 107,867
 Masirah, population (2017): 15,719, (2020): 13,902

Demographics

See also
 Eastern Arabia
 Sharqiya Sands

References

 
Governorates of Oman